A list of films produced by the Tollywood (Bengali language film industry) based in Kolkata in the year 1960.

A-Z of films

References

1960
Bengali
Films, Bengali